Simon Yates is the name of:

Simon Yates (mountaineer) (born 1963), English mountaineer
Simon Yates (golfer) (born 1970), Scottish golfer
Simon Yates (cyclist) (born 1992), English cyclist